HMS Agincourt was a dreadnought battleship built in the United Kingdom in the early 1910s. Originally part of Brazil's role in a South American naval arms race, she holds the distinction of mounting more heavy guns (fourteen) and more turrets (seven) than any other dreadnought battleship, in keeping with the Brazilians' requirement for an especially impressive design.

Brazil ordered the ship in 1911 as Rio de Janeiro from the British company Armstrong Whitworth. However, the collapse of Brazil's rubber boom and a warming in relations with Argentina, the country's chief rival, led to the ship's sale while under construction to the Ottoman Empire. The Ottomans renamed her Sultan Osman I, after the empire's founder, and the ship was nearly complete when the First World War broke out. The British government seized her for use by the Royal Navy, together with another Ottoman dreadnought being constructed in Britain. This act caused resentment in the Ottoman Empire, as the payments for both ships were complete, and contributed to the decision of the Ottoman government to join the Central Powers.

Renamed Agincourt by the Royal Navy, she joined the Grand Fleet in the North Sea. During the war, the ship spent the bulk of her time on patrols and exercises, although she did participate in the Battle of Jutland in 1916. Agincourt was put into reserve in 1919 and sold for scrap in 1922 to meet the terms of the Washington Naval Treaty.

Background

In the unstable period during and following the 1889 coup in Brazil, which deposed Emperor Dom Pedro II, and the 1893–94 navy revolt, the Brazilian Navy found itself unable to care for its own ships, let alone acquire new vessels. Meanwhile, Chile had agreed to a naval-limiting pact in 1902 with Brazil's principal rival, Argentina, as part of solving a larger boundary dispute, but they both retained the vessels built in the interim, many of which were significantly more modern and powerful than Brazil's ships.

Rising international demand for coffee and rubber in the early 20th century brought Brazil an influx of revenue. Simultaneously, the Baron of Rio Branco spearheaded a drive by prominent Brazilians to force the leading world nations to recognize Brazil as an international power. The National Congress of Brazil inaugurated a large naval acquisition program in late 1904. They ordered three small battleships in 1906, but the launch of  caused the Brazilian Navy to reconsider their purchase. In March 1907, they signed a contract for three s. Two ships would be constructed immediately by the British companies Armstrong Whitworth and Vickers, with the third to follow.

Alarmed at the Brazilian move, Argentina and Chile quickly nullified their 1902 pact and sought dreadnoughts of their own. Argentina's orders, after a drawn-out bidding process, went to an American company, Fore River Shipbuilding Company, while Chile's orders, delayed by the 1906 Valparaíso earthquake, went to Armstrong. Since Brazil's relations with Argentina were warming and the country's economic boom was losing steam, the government negotiated with Armstrong to remove the third dreadnought from the contract, but without success. They borrowed the necessary money, and Armstrong laid down Rio de Janeiros keel in March 1910.

The Brazilian Navy had divided into two distinct factions, based on the size of the main battery. The outgoing naval minister favoured an increase over the 12-inch guns mounted on board the Minas Geraes class, while his incoming counterpart, Admiral Marques Leão, favoured keeping the smaller but faster-firing gun. While the exact influences upon the Brazilian government are unclear, Leão was advocating strongly for his position in meetings with President Hermes da Fonseca. Other events probably influenced them as well, such as the November 1910 Revolt of the Lash, payments on loans taken out for the dreadnoughts, and a worsening economy that had led to high government debt compounded by budget deficits. By May 1911, Fonseca had made up his mind:

When I assumed office, I found that my predecessor had signed a contract for the building of the battleship Rio de Janeiro, a vessel of 32,000 tons, with an armament of 14 in. guns. Considerations of every kind pointed to the inconvenience of acquiring such a vessel and to the revision of the contract in the sense of reducing the tonnage. This was done, and we shall possess a powerful unit which will not be built on exaggerated lines such as have not as yet stood the time of experience.

A contract to build the ship that would become Agincourt was signed on 3 June 1911, and its keel was laid on 14 September 1911. The design called for fourteen 12-inch guns, an extreme number that historian David Topliss attributed to political necessity: the ship had to appear more powerful to the Brazilian populace than her predecessors (with twelve 12-inch guns) but, without increasing the gun size, the only option left was increasing the total number of guns.

Design and description

General characteristics
She had a large turning circle, but manoeuvred well despite her great length. She was considered to be a good gun platform.

When she came to serve in the Royal Navy, Agincourt was considered a particularly comfortable ship and very well-appointed internally. A knowledge of Portuguese was necessary to work many of the fittings—including those in the heads—as the original instruction plates had not all been replaced when she was taken over by the British. In 1917, her crew numbered 1,268 officers and men.

Propulsion
Agincourt had four Parsons direct-drive steam turbines, each of which drove one propeller shaft. The high-pressure ahead and astern turbines drove the wing shafts while the low-pressure ahead and astern turbines drove the inner shafts.

Electrical power was provided by four steam-driven reciprocating electrical generators.

Armament

Agincourt mounted fourteen BL 12-inch Mk XIII 45-calibre guns in seven twin hydraulically powered turrets, unofficially named after the days of the week, starting from Sunday, forward to aft. This was the largest number of turrets and heavy guns ever mounted on a dreadnought battleship. The guns could be depressed to −3° and elevated to 13.5°. The rate of fire of these guns was 1.5 rounds per minute. When a full broadside was fired, "the resulting sheet of flame was big enough to create the impression that a battle cruiser had blown up; it was awe inspiring." No damage was done to the ship when firing full broadsides, despite the common idea that doing so would break the ship in half, but much of the ship's tableware and glassware did shatter when Agincourt fired her first broadside.

As built, Agincourt mounted eighteen BL 6-inch Mk XIII 50-calibre guns. Fourteen were placed in armoured casemates on the upper deck and two each in the fore and aft superstructures, protected by gun shields. After the ship was seized by the British, two more were added abreast the bridge in pivot mounts, protected by gun shields. The guns could be depressed to −7° and elevated to 13°, later increased to 15°. Their rate of fire was about five to seven rounds per minute, but this dropped to about three rounds per minute after the ready ammunition was used up because the ammunition hoists were too slow or few to keep the guns fully supplied. About 150 rounds were carried per gun.

Close-range defence against torpedo boats was provided by ten  45-calibre quick-firing guns. These were mounted in the superstructure in pivot mounts and protected by gun shields. Agincourt also carried three  submerged torpedo tubes; one was on each beam and the last was in the stern. The water that entered the torpedo tubes when they were fired was discharged into the torpedo flat to facilitate reloading the tube and then pumped overboard. Ten torpedoes were carried for them.

Fire control
Each turret was fitted with an armoured rangefinder in the turret roof. In addition, another one was mounted on top of the foretop. By the time of the Battle of Jutland in 1916, Agincourt was possibly the only dreadnought of the Grand Fleet not fitted with a Dreyer fire-control table. A fire-control director was later fitted below the foretop and one turret was modified to control the entire main armament later in the war. A director for the  guns was added on each side in 1916–17. A high-angle rangefinder was added in 1918 to the spotting top.

Armour
So much weight had been devoted to Agincourts armament that little remained for her armour. Forward of this the belt thinned to six inches for about  before further reducing to  all the way to the bow. The upper belt extended from the main to the upper deck and was six inches thick. It ran from "Monday" barbette to "Thursday" barbette. The armour bulkheads at each end of the ship angled inwards from the ends of the midships armoured belts to the end barbettes and were three inches thick.

The armour of the barbettes constituted a major weakness in Agincourts protection. They were 9 inches thick above the upper deck level, but decreased to 3 inches between the upper and main decks and had no armour at all below the main deck except for "Sunday" barbette (which had 3 inches), and "Thursday" and "Saturday" barbettes (which had 2 inches). The turret roofs were 3 inches thick at the front and 2 inches at the rear. The casemates for the secondary armament were protected by 6 inches of armour and were defended from raking fire by 6-inch-thick bulkheads.

The main conning tower was protected by 12 inches of armour on its sides and it had a 4-inch roof. The aft conning tower (sometimes called the torpedo control tower) had 9-inch sides and a 3-inch roof. The communications tube down from each position was 6 inches thick above the upper deck and 2 inches thick below it. Each magazine was protected by two armour plates on each side as torpedo bulkheads, the first one an inch thick and the second one and a half inches thick.

Agincourt had another weakness in that she was not subdivided to Royal Navy standards as the Brazilians preferred to eliminate all possible watertight bulkheads that might limit the size of the compartments and interfere with the crew's comfort.

Wartime modifications
Approximately  of high-tensile steel was added to the main deck after the Battle of Jutland to protect the magazines. Two  anti-aircraft guns were added to the quarterdeck in 1917–18. A  rangefinder was added to the former searchlight platform on the foremast at the same time. A high-angle rangefinder was added to the spotting top in 1918.

Construction and seizure

Rio de Janeiro, as Agincourt was named by her first owners, was laid down on 14 September 1911 by Armstrongs in Newcastle upon Tyne and launched on 22 January 1913. After the keel-laying, the Brazilian government found itself in an unenviable position: a European depression after the end of the Second Balkan War in August 1913 reduced Brazil's ability to obtain foreign loans, while at the same time Brazil's coffee and rubber exports collapsed, the latter due to the loss of the Brazilian rubber monopoly to British plantations in the Far East. In addition, reports on new dreadnought construction coming in from overseas indicated that the vessel would be outclassed upon completion. These factors caused Brazil to put the ship up for sale in October 1913, and she was sold to the Ottoman Navy for £2,750,000 on 28 December 1913. Renamed Sultân Osmân-ı Evvel, she underwent trials during the July Crisis the following year and was completed in August, just as the First World War was beginning.

The war broke out during her sea trials before delivery. Even though the Ottoman crew had arrived to collect her, the British Government took over the vessel for incorporation into the Royal Navy. The Turkish captain, waiting with five hundred Turkish sailors aboard a transport in the River Tyne, threatened to board his ship and hoist the Turkish flag; First Lord of the Admiralty Winston Churchill gave orders to resist such an attempt "by armed force if necessary." At the same time, the British also took over a second Ottoman battleship, a -derived vessel being built by Vickers—Reşadiye—which was renamed . Such an action was allowed in the contract only if Britain was at war at the time, but since Britain was not yet at war, these actions were illegal; the British government nevertheless determined to present the Ottomans with a fait accompli. On 3 August, a day before Germany invaded Belgium, causing British political elites to reach a consensus on entering the war, the British ambassador to the Ottoman Empire informed the government that Britain had seized the ships. Churchill did not want to risk the ships being used against the British, but it had consequences.

The takeover caused considerable ill will in the Ottoman Empire, where public subscriptions had partially funded the ships. When the Ottoman government had been in a financial deadlock over the budget of the battleships, donations for the Ottoman Navy had come in from taverns, cafés, schools and markets, and large donations were rewarded with a "Navy Donation Medal". The seizure, and the gifts of the German battlecruiser  and the cruiser  to the Ottomans, influenced public opinion in the Empire to turn away from Britain, and they entered the war on the side of Germany and the Austro-Hungarian Empire against the Triple Entente of Britain, France, and Russia on 29 October, after Goeben had attacked Russian facilities in the Black Sea.

The Royal Navy made modifications to Agincourt before commissioning her: in particular, it removed the flying bridge over the two centre turrets. The ship was also initially fitted with Turkish-style lavatories that had to be replaced. Her name, "Agincourt", was a favourite of Churchill's, and had initially been allocated to a sixth vessel of the  ordered under the 1914–15 Naval Estimates, but not yet begun at the war's outbreak. Her nickname, The Gin Palace, came from her luxurious fittings and a corruption of her name ("A Gin Court"), pink gin being a popular drink among Royal Navy officers at the time.

The Admiralty was unprepared to man a ship of Agincourts size on such short notice and her crew was drawn "from the highest and lowest echelons of the service: the Royal yachts, and the detention barracks." Most of the naval reservists had already been called up by this time and sent to other ships, so a number of minor criminals who had had their sentences remitted were received from various naval prisons and detention camps.

Service
Agincourt was working up until 7 September 1914, when she joined the 4th Battle Squadron (BS) of the Grand Fleet. The fleet anchorage at Scapa Flow was not yet secure against submarine attack and much of the fleet was kept at sea, where Agincourt spent forty of her first eighty days with the Grand Fleet. This was the beginning of "a year and a half of inaction, only broken by occasional North Sea 'sweeps' intended to draw the enemy from his bases."

On 1 January 1915, Agincourt was still assigned to the 4th BS, but had been assigned to the 1st Battle Squadron before the Battle of Jutland on 31 May 1916. The Sixth Division was the starboardmost column of the Grand Fleet as it headed south to rendezvous with the ships of Admiral Beatty's Battle Cruiser Fleet, then engaged with their opposite numbers from the German High Seas Fleet in the North Sea. Admiral Jellicoe, commander of the Grand Fleet, kept it in cruising formation until 18:15, when he ordered it to deploy from column into a single line based on the port division, each ship turning 90° in succession. This turn made the Sixth Division the closest ships in the Grand Fleet to the battleships of the High Seas Fleet, and they fired on each ship as they made their turn to port. This concentration of fire later became known as "Windy Corner" to the British, as the ships were drenched by German shell splashes although none were hit.

At 18:24, Agincourt opened fire on a German battlecruiser with her main guns. Shortly afterwards her six-inch guns followed suit as German destroyers made torpedo attacks on the British battleships to cover the turn to the south of the High Seas Fleet. Agincourt successfully evaded two torpedoes, although another struck Marlborough. Visibility cleared around 19:15, and she engaged a  without result before it was lost in the smoke and haze. Around 20:00, Marlborough was forced to reduce speed because of the strain on her bulkheads from her torpedo damage and her division mates conformed to her speed. In the reduced visibility the division lost sight of the Grand Fleet during the night, passing the badly damaged battlecruiser  without opening fire. Dawn found them with only the detritus from the previous day's battle in sight and the division arrived back at Scapa Flow on 2 June. Agincourt fired 144 twelve-inch shells and 111 six-inch shells during the battle, although she is not known to have hit anything.

Although the Grand Fleet made several sorties over the next few years it is not known if Agincourt participated in them. On 23 April 1918, Agincourt and Hercules were stationed at Scapa Flow to provide cover for the Scandinavian convoys between Norway and Britain when the High Seas Fleet sortied in an attempt to destroy the convoy. The reports from German Intelligence were slightly off schedule, as both the inbound and outbound convoys were in port when the Germans reached their normal route, so Admiral Scheer ordered the fleet to return to Germany without spotting any British ships.

Agincourt was later transferred to the 2nd Battle Squadron and was present at the surrender of the High Seas Fleet on 21 November 1918. She was placed in reserve at Rosyth in March 1919. After unsuccessful attempts to sell her to the Brazilian Government, she was listed for disposal in April 1921, but was used for experimental purposes later that year. The Royal Navy then planned to convert her into a mobile naval base and she was recommissioned on 21 November in preparation for the conversion, which would have included the removal of five of her seven turrets with their barbettes converted into storage and workshops; Nos. 2 and 5 turrets would have been retained. The conversion was cancelled on 23 February 1922 after the Washington Naval Treaty was signed that limited the battleship tonnage allowed to the RN and she was paid off on 7 April and listed again for disposal.

The ship was sold on 22 January 1923 to J&W Purves for £25,000 with the proviso that she had to be demolished 18 months after the treaty had been ratified. Her contract was immediately transferred to the Rosyth Shipbreaking Co. which had leased facilities at Rosyth Dockyard for that purpose. As the deadline of 17 January 1925 approached, the ship did not yet meet the treaty standards for scrapping. The Admiralty agreed that cutting the hull in half would be acceptable and the company attempted to move the ship through the dockyard locks on the highest Spring Tide to its beaching ground to complete the demolition. Bad weather thwarted that effort and the Admiralty agreed to allow the use of one of Rosyth's dry docks to meet the deadline. Two days later the hull had been severed and both halves had been floated out so they could be beached.

Notes

Footnotes

Bibliography

External links

 Dreadnought Project – Technical material on the weaponry and fire control for the ship
 Maritimequest HMS Agincourt Photo Gallery
 Agincourt Class Battleship – includes a diagram of her layout
 Battle of Jutland Crew Lists Project – HMS Agincourt Crew List

1913 ships
Ships built by Armstrong Whitworth
Battleships of the Brazilian Navy
Battleships of the Ottoman Navy
Battleships of the Royal Navy
Ships built on the River Tyne
World War I battleships of the United Kingdom